Naissa Mosque is a mosque in Qardaha, along the Syrian coast. It was built in 1989 by architect Abdul Rahman Naassan, and funded by the mother of former president Hafez al-Assad, Naissa Assad—after whom the mosque was named. The state funeral of Hafez al-Assad was observed at the mosque.

Architecture
The structure consists of an octagonal prayer hall covered by a dome and pierced by twenty-four colored glass windows. Outside, the courtyard, with a marble mosaic water fountain in the center, is connected to the mosque by porticoes. Also included in the building is a library situated behind the southern portico, and a reception hall behind the eastern portico. 

The architectural style of the mosque is similar to the Dome of the Rock in Jerusalem, with its octagonal shape and dome form. The transparency of the porticoes on the main elevation achieve a central lightness, while at the same time being weighted down at either end by the minaret and the dome of the prayer hall. The minaret and reception hall also balance the opposing volumes of the courtyard and the prayer hall.

References

1989 establishments in Syria
Mosques completed in 1989
Mosques in Syria
Buildings and structures in Latakia Governorate